Chandana Sarkar is an Indian politician. She was elected to the West Bengal Legislative Assembly from Baisnabnagar as a member of the Trinamool Congress. She is referred to as the people's helper. She is famous all over Malda district for her work and help to the people. As of now she has also become the President of Malda Zilla Parishad.http://mlachandanasarkar/facebook.com.

EARLY LIFE

She was also the Prodhan of 18 mile gram Panchayat.

References

Living people
Year of birth missing (living people)
Indian politicians
West Bengal Legislative Assembly
Trinamool Congress politicians
Trinamool Congress politicians from West Bengal
21st-century Indian politicians
21st-century Indian women politicians